The China women's national softball team is the national team of the People's Republic of China. It is governed by the Chinese Softball Association and takes part in international softball competitions. They are ranked number four according to the 2006 ISF World Championship.

The team competed at the 1990 ISF Women's World Championship in Normal, Illinois where they finished with 8 wins and 1 loss. The team competed at the 1994 ISF Women's World Championship in St. John's, Newfoundland where they finished second.  The team competed at the 1998 ISF Women's World Championship in Fujinomiya City, Japan where they finished fourth. The team competed at the 2002 ISF Women's World Championship in Saskatoon, Saskatchewan where they finished fourth. The team competed at the 2006 ISF Women's World Championship in Beijing, China where they finished fourth. The team competed at the 2010 ISF Women's World Championship in Caracas, Venezuela where they finished fourth.

2008 Olympic Team

Results
 ISF Women's World Championship: Silver Medal - 1986, 1994; Bronze Medal - 1990
 2006 Japan Softball Cup: 3rd
 World Cup of Softball: 4th (2007), 5th (2006)

References

External links 
 International Softball Federation

Softball
Women's national softball teams
Softball in China